Globidrillia micans is a species of sea snail, a marine gastropod mollusk in the family Drilliidae.

Description
The size of an adult shell varies between 7 mm and 15 mm. The chestnut-colored shell has small, rather sharp, whitish, oblique ribs, fading towards the suture. The back of the body whorl is smooth. The outer lip is thin, acute and smooth within.

Distribution
This species occurs in the demersal zone of the Pacific Ocean off Nicaragua and Costa Rica.

References

  Tucker, J.K. 2004 Catalog of recent and fossil turrids (Mollusca: Gastropoda). Zootaxa 682:1–1295

External links
 

micans
Gastropods described in 1843